is the first album by the Japanese pop idol group Cute, released on October 25, 2006 on the Zetima label. The album was released in limited and regular editions. The limited edition included an extra DVD.

The album debuted at number 7 in the Daily Oricon Albums Chart. It ranked 15th in the Oricon weekly chart, staying in the list for 3 weeks.

As of 2011, it remains C-ute's 2nd best selling album.

Track listing 
All songs written and composed by Tsunku.

CD
 
 
 
 
 
 
 "As One"
 
 "Endless Love ~I Love You More~ (°C-ute Version)"
Limited Edition DVD
  (from "Cutie Circuit 2006 Final in Yomiuriland East Live: September 10 is °C-ute's Day")
 SPOT

Charts

References

External links 
 Cutie Queen Vol.1 entry on the Hello! Project official website 

2006 debut albums
Cute (Japanese idol group) albums
Zetima albums